Clark Coolidge (born February 26, 1939) is an American poet.

Background
As a teenager, Coolidge attended Classical High School in Providence, Rhode Island. Coolidge attended Brown University, where his father taught in the music department. After moving to New York City in the early 1960s, Coolidge  cultivated links with Ted Berrigan and Bernadette Mayer. In 1967, Coolidge moved to San Francisco and joined David Meltzer's band, The Serpent Power, as a drummer. Often associated with the Language School his experience as a jazz drummer and interest in a wide array of subjects including caves, geology, bebop, weather, Salvador Dalí, Jack Kerouac and movies, Coolidge often finds correspondence in his work. Coolidge grew up in Providence, Rhode Island and has lived, among other places, in Manhattan, Cambridge (MA), San Francisco, Rome (Italy), and the Berkshire Hills. He currently lives in Petaluma, California.

Publications

Flag Flutter & U.S. Electric, (New York: Lines Books, 1966).
ING, (New York: Angel Hair, 1968).
(with Tom Veitch) To Obtain the Value of the Cake Measure From Zero: A Play in One Act, (San Francisco: Pants Press, 1970).
Space, (New York: Harper & Row, 1970).
The So: Poems 1966, (New York: Adventures in Poetry, 1971).
Suite V, (New York: Adventures in Poetry, 1973).
The Maintains, (San Francisco, CA: This Press, 1974).
Polaroid, (New York: Adventures in Poetry / Bolinas, CA: Big Sky, 1975).
Quartz Hearts, (San Francisco: This Press, 1978).
Own Face, (Lenox, MA: Angel Hair Books, 1978. Reprinted Los Angeles: Sun & Moon Press, 1993).
Smithsonian Depositions & Subject to a Film, (New York: Vehicle Editions, 1980).
A Geology, (Needham, MA: Potes & Poets Press, 1981. Reprinted in 1988 and 1999).
American Ones, (Bolinas, CA: Tombouctou, 1981).
Research, (Berkeley, CA: Tuumba Press, 1982).
Mine: The One That Enters the Stories, (Berkeley, CA: The Figures, 1982).
Solution Passage: Poems 1978-1981, (Los Angeles: Sun & Moon Press, 1986).
The Crystal Text, (Great Barrington, MA: The Figures, 1986. Reprinted Los Angeles: Sun & Moon Press, 1995).
Melencholia, (Great Barrington, MA: The Figures, 1987).
At Egypt, (Great Barrington, MA: The Figures, 1988).
Sound as Thought: Poems 1982-1984, (Los Angeles: Sun & Moon Press, 1990).
(with Ron Padgett) Supernatural Overtones, (Great Barrington, MA: The Figures, 1990).
Odes of Roba, (Great Barrington, MA: The Figures, 1991).
The Book of During, (Great Barrington, MA: The Figures, 1991).
(with Philip Guston) Baffling Means: Writings/Drawings, (Stockbridge, MA: O-blek Editions, 1991).
(with Michael Gizzi and John Yau) Lowell Connector: Lines & Shots from Kerouac's Town, (West Stockbridge, MA: Hard Press, 1993).
(with Larry Fagin) On the Pumice of Morons, (Great Barrington, MA: The Figures, 1993).
The ROVA Improvisations, (Los Angeles: Sun & Moon Press, 1994).
Registers (People in All), (Avenue B, 1994).
For Kurt Cobain, (Great Barrington, MA: The Figures, 1995).
The Names, (Brightlingsea, Essex: Active in Airtime, 1997).
Now It's Jazz: Writings on Kerouac & The Sounds, (Albuquerque, NM: Living Batch, 1999).
(with Keith Waldrop) Bomb, (New York: Granary Books, 2000).
Alien Tatters, (Berkeley, CA: Atelos, 2000).
On The Nameways, Volume 1, (Great Barrington, MA: The Figures, 2000).
On The Nameways, Volume 2, (Great Barrington, MA: The Figures, 2001).
Far Out West, (New York: Adventures in Poetry, 2001).
On the Slates, (Oakland, CA: Tougher Disguises, 2002).
Counting on Planet Zero, (Wendell, MA : Fewer & Further Press, 2007).
The Act of Providence, (Qua Press, 2010).
 This Time We Are Both, (Ugly Duckling Press, 2010).
 Book Beginning What and Ending Away, (Fence Books, 2013).
 88 Sonnets, (Fence Books, 2013).
 Selected Poems: 1962-1985, (Station Hill Press, 2017)

As editor
Heart of the Breath: Poems 1979-1992 by Jim Brody. Hard Press Editions, 1996 
Philip Guston: Collected Writings, Lectures, and Conversations. Berkeley, CA: University of California Press, 2010

References

External links
Clark Coolidge Homepage @ the Electronic Poetry Center
From Notebooks (1976-1982) from Code of Signals, edited by Michael Palmer (PDF file at Duration Press, pages 43–56)
 A Symposium on Clark Coolidge, edited by Ron Silliman, published as No. 5 of Stations magazine,  Winter, 1978 (PDF file at Eclipse Archive )
Clark Coolidge Feature @ Jacket Magazine features poems, essays, interviews
Clark Coolidge on Jack Kerouac
"Add-Verse" a poetry-photo-video project Coolidge participated in
Clark Coolidge as Literary Critic In this piece, Ron Silliman notes that Coolidge has produced "the finest critical writing I’ve ever read on Kerouac’s work".
Review of Clark Coolidge's This Time We Are Both.

1939 births
American male poets
Classical High School alumni
Language poets
People from Petaluma, California
Living people
Writers from Providence, Rhode Island